For the 2001 Tour de France, the organisers felt that the previous edition did not include not enough French teams and consequently changed the selection procedure as follows.  was selected because it included the winner (prior to disqualification) of the previous edition, Lance Armstrong.  was selected because it included the winner of the 2000 UCI Road World Cup (Erik Zabel).  was selected because it won the team classifications in the 2000 Giro d'Italia  was selected because it won the team classifications in both the 2000 Tour de France and 2000 Vuelta a España. This was extended to 16 teams based on the UCI ranking in the highest UCI division at the end of 2001, after compensating for transfers. Although initially it was announced that four wildcards would be given, the tour organisation decided to add five teams:

In total, 21 teams participated, each with 9 cyclists, giving a total of 189 cyclists.

Teams

Qualified teams

Invited teams

Cyclists

By starting number

By team

By nationality

References

2001 Tour de France
2001